The Diocese of Ungheni and Nisporeni is an eparchy or diocese of the Metropolis of Chișinău and All Moldova under the Moscow Patriarchate with its seat in the city of Ungheni, Moldova.

History
The Eparchy of Ungheni and Nisporeni was established on October 6, 2006, by the Holy Synod of the Russian Orthodox Church out of the territory of the Eparchy of Chișinău.

As of 2010 the Eparchy consisted of 145 parishes, 9 monasteries, and 1 skete served by 147 full-time priests and 5 deacons. Its current bishop is Petru (Musteață).

External links
Eparchy of Ungheni and Nisporeni (Moldovan/Romanian)
Eparchy of Ungheni and Nisporeni (Russian)

Eparchies of the Russian Orthodox Church
Eastern Orthodox dioceses in Moldova